Coquenia is an extinct genus of Notoungulate, belonging to the family Leontiniidae. It lived during the Middle Eocene, in what is today Argentina.

Description

Known only from skull and mandible remains, Coquenia may have been a heavily built animal, about the size of a sheep. This animal dentition was low-crowned (brachydont), and the incisors resembled canines, with labial and lingual cingulum. The second upper incisor was more developed than the two others, a typical characteristic of the Leontiniidae, while the upper canines had a rotated crown, with labial and lingual cingulum. The four premolars had an anterolingual cingulum with a small basin located directly in front of the protocone. The premolars progressively increased in size towards the back of the jaw. The upper molars had a labial cingulum, and a posterior dimple, like the lower molars. The third upper molar was wider at the base of its lingual side.

Classification

Coquenia is a basal member of the family Leontiniidae, a group of toxodont Notoungulates that appeared during the Eocene and survived until the Miocene, with a robust body and massive legs. Coquenia was one of the earliest members of the family, along with its relative Martinmiguelia.

Coquenia bondi was first described in 2008, based on fossil remains from the Pampa Grande locality of the Lumbrera Formation, in the Salta Province of Argentina.

Bibliography
M. V. Deraco, J. E. Powell, and G. Lopez. 2008. Primer leontínido (Mammalia, Notoungulata) de la Formación Lumbrera (Subgrupo Santa Bárbara, Grupo Salta-Paleógeno) del noroeste argentino. Ameghiniana 45(1):83-91
J. E. Powell, M. J. Babot, D. A. García López, M. V. Deraco, and C. Herrera. 2011. Eocene vertebrates of northwest Argentina: annotated list. In J. Salfity, R. A. Marquillas (eds.), Cenozoic Geology of the Central Andes of Argentina 349–370

Toxodonts
Eocene mammals of South America
Paleogene Argentina
Fossils of Argentina
Fossil taxa described in 2008
Prehistoric placental genera